No. 22 Group is one of six groups currently active in the Royal Air Force, falling under the responsibility of Deputy Commander-in-Chief (Personnel) in Air Command.  Its previous title up until 2018 was No. 22 (Training) Group. It is responsible for RAF training policy and controlling the Royal Air Force College and the RAF's training stations.  As such, it is the direct successor to Training Group.

History
Although No. 22 Group was due to be formed on 1 April 1918, the same day as the RAF was established, it was not activated until 1 July 1918 in the RAF's North-Western Area. It was activated at East Fortune but moved its headquarters to the Station Hotel, Stirling.  The next month, on 8 August 1918, it received the designation 'Operations', or possibly 'Marine Operational', making its full title No. 22 (Operations) Group or possibly No. 22 (Marine Operational) Group. It controlled No. 78 Wing RAF, and stations at Auldbar, Chathill (airship station), Dundee, East Fortune, Kirkwall/Orkney, Longside (airship station), Luce Bay, RAF Machrihanish, Peterhead & Strathberg. With the post First World War RAF force reductions, No. 22 Group was disbanded on 30 May 1919.

The next creation of No 22 Group came on 12 April 1926 when the group was re-formed from No 7 Group within Inland Area.  The group's designation was No. 22 (Army Co-operation) Group and its headquarters was at South Farnborough.  On 17 February 1936, No 22 Group was transferred from the control of Inland Area to that of the Air Defence of Great Britain.  Later that same year, on 1 May, the group was raised to command status.  However, only just over two months later, on 14 July, the newly created command was reduced back to group status, becoming part of Fighter Command on the day of Fighter Command's creation. In 1938 the group comprised 26 Squadron at Catterick; RAF Hawkinge with 2 Squadron; RAF Odiham & No. 50 (Army Cooperation) Wing, with 4, 13, and 53 Squadrons; RAF Old Sarum with the School of Army Co-operation and 16 and No. 59 Squadron RAFs; and group headquarters and No. 1 Anti-Aircraft Cooperation Unit at South Farnborough. 

On 24 June 1940 No 22 Group was once again raised to command status and later that year, on 1 December, the new command was expanded to become RAF Army Cooperation Command.

On 1 August 1943, the group was re-established as No. 22 (Training) Group in Technical Training Command, responsible for all training in ground trades, from electronics to cooking.  The group continued in its training function for nearly 30 years until it was disbanded 31 January 1972.

The current creation of No. 22 Group was established on 30 October 2006, once again as No. 22 (Training) Group.  This creation was a renaming of Training Group which ceased to exist as No 22 Group was re-established.

Organisation and responsibilities
The group is responsible for:
Youth engagement across the UK;
Recruiting, selection and basic training;
Defence technical training – communications & engineering;
UK Military Flying Training System;
RAF Force Development, Adventurous Training, survival and specialist training;
 RAF-wide training assurance;
 Accreditation and resettlement;
 All RAF sport.

The areas of responsibility are:
 Royal Air Force Air Cadets (RAFAC)
 RAF College Cranwell and Directorate of Recruiting & Individual Training
 The Directorate of Flying Training (DFT)
 The Directorate of Ground Training (DGT)
 The Defence College of Technical Training (DCTT) consisting of:
 The Defence College of Aeronautical Engineering (DSAE)
 The Defence College of Communications and Information Systems (DSCIS)
 The Defence College of Electro-Mechanical Engineering (DSEME) at MoD Lyneham
 The Directorate of RAF Sport (DRS).

Commanders
Currently, No 22 Group is led by Air Vice-Marshal Richard Maddison OBE, who is Chief of Staff Training and Air Officer Commanding No. 22 Group. AVM Maddison is responsible to his superior commander, the Air Member for Personnel, who is also deputy commander-in-chief personnel in Air Command.

1918 to 1919
1 July 1918 Colonel, later Brigadier General, E A D Masterman

1926 to 1940
12 April 1926 Air Commodore D le G Pitcher
9 April 1929 Air Commodore N D K MacEwen
14 September 1931 Air Commodore H LeM Brock
30 June 1936 Air Commodore, later Air Vice-Marshal B E Sutton
3 July 1939 Air Vice-Marshal C H B Blount
15 September 1939 Air Vice-Marshal N D K MacEwen
30 May 1940 Air Vice-Marshal C H B Blount
23 October 1940 Not Known
20 November 1940 Air Marshal Sir Arthur Barratt

1943 to 1972
1 August 1943 Air Vice-Marshal C E V Porter
1946 to 1948 Air Vice-Marshal A C Stevens
19 January 1948 Air Vice-Marshal P E Maitland
15 June 1950 Air Vice-Marshal B V Reynolds
25 August 1952 Air Vice-Marshal W H Merton
1 December 1953 Air Vice-Marshal J L F Fuller-Good
15 January 1957 Air Vice-Marshal R Faville
12 September 1960 Air Vice-Marshal B A Chacksfield
12 November 1962 Air Vice-Marshal A A Case
15 January 1966 Air Vice-Marshal W V Crawford-Crompton
1 July 1968 Air Vice-Marshal G R Magill
1 January 1970 Air Vice-Marshal E Plumtree

2006 onwards
30 October 2006 Air Vice-Marshal J M M Ponsonby
 July 2007 Air Vice-Marshal R F Garwood CBE DFC
 17 April 2009 Air Vice-Marshal B M North OBE
 23 February 2010 Air Vice-Marshal M C Green CBE
 2011 Air Vice-Marshal M G Lloyd CB
 18 July 2014 Air Vice-Marshal Andrew Turner CBE
 July 2017  Air Vice-Marshall Warren "Bunny" James
 August 2020 Air Vice-Marshal Richard Maddison

References

External links
 

022
Training units and formations of the Royal Air Force
Military units and formations established in 1918
Organisations based in Buckinghamshire
Wycombe District
1918 establishments in the United Kingdom